Rowhouses at 303-327 East North Avenue is a group of historic rowhouses located at Baltimore, Maryland, United States. The row houses at 303-317 and 319-327 East North Avenue consists of two groups of brick Victorian row houses that rest on high masonry foundations and are four stories high which includes a mansard roof.  These two groups of row houses are some of the most elaborately decorated rows that were constructed in Baltimore in the late 19th century outside of Mount Vernon.

Rowhouses at 303-327 East North Avenue was listed on the National Register of Historic Places in 1984.

References

External links
, including photo from 1980, at Maryland Historical Trust

Greenmount West, Baltimore
Houses in Baltimore
Houses on the National Register of Historic Places in Baltimore
Houses completed in 1879
Second Empire architecture in Maryland